The Aminidivi Islands, are one of the three island subgroups in the Union Territory of Lakshadweep, India. It is the northern group of the Lakshadweep, separated from the Laccadive Islands subgroup roughly by the 11th parallel north. The total land area of the group is 9.26 km².

Formerly the Union Territory was known as Laccadive, Minicoy, and Amindivi Islands, a name that was changed to Lakshadweep by an act of Parliament in 1973.
The Aminidivi group forms a taluka or subdivision. The islands of Amini, Kiltan, Chetlat, Kadmat and Bitra are inhabited.  The population numbered 18,876 at the 2001 census and Islam is the main religion of the islanders.

Aminidivi has the highest recorded rainfall in India in a 24-hour period, at 1,168 mm on 2004-05-06.

Geography
Aminidivi consists of atolls with islands, three reefs or atolls with only unvegetated sand cays above the high water mark, and four submerged banks.

Climate

History
The islands were inhabited from ancient times by people of nearby Kerala to which were added later people of Arab descent. Vasco da Gama visited these islands around 1498. In the mid 16th century all the inhabited islands of the Lakshadweep were conferred as jagir on the ruling family of the Cannanore Kingdom (Arakkal Kingdom) by the Chirakkal or Kolattiri Raja in order to grant protection from the Portuguese.

In the latter quarter of the 18th century the islands of the Amindivi group of the Lakshadweep revolted owing to the rigours of the enforcement of the monopoly of coir rope trade. Following the uprising, the northern islands put themselves under the rule of the Kingdom of Mysore in 1784, then ruled by Tippu Sultan. The southern group of the Cannanore Islands, however, remained loyal to the Arakkal Kingdom.

In 1792, as a consequence of the Third Anglo-Mysore War and the defeat of Tippu Sultan, the Amindivi Islands came under the East India Company rule following the treaty of Srirangapatna. The Amindivi subgroup was then attached to the Kasaragod taluk of South Canara in the Madras Presidency of the British Raj in 1799, hence they also became known as the South Kanara Islands.

Bibliography
R. H. Ellis, A Short Account of the Laccadive Islands and Minicoy. Government Press, Madras, 1924
K.P. Ittaman, Amini Islanders: Social Structure and Change, Abhinav Publications, Delhi, 1976, ASIN B0060D0XK8

References

External links
Full text of "Laccadive Islands And Minicoy"

Landforms of Lakshadweep
Archipelagoes of India